McLaren Flint is a nonprofit, 378 bed tertiary teaching hospital located in Flint, Michigan. McLaren is affiliated with the Michigan State University College of Human Medicine's medical residency programs, including family medicine, internal medicine, general surgery, orthopedic surgery and radiology. McLaren also maintains a hematology/oncology fellowship program in partnership with Michigan State University and is sponsoring a surgical oncology fellowship program. McLaren Flint is a subsidiary of McLaren Health Care Corporation.

Overview 
The hospital is designated by various organizations such as Blue Cross Blue Shield and ASBMS as a "Center Of Excellence" in the following services:

Heart and Vascular Program: Certified by Blue Cross Blue Shield of Michigan as a Cardiac Center of Excellence, McLaren offers a broad spectrum of cardiac diagnostic capabilities including three-dimensional echocardiography and cardiac CT. Physician specialists perform minimally invasive cardiac catheterization procedures such as angioplasty, electrophysiology, and stenting. The vascular surgeons on staff are actively involved in research and are among a selected group of participants in carotid stenting clinical trials. Cardiothoracic surgeons on staff perform open and minimally invasive surgeries. Certain cardiac procedures are performed with the assistance of the da Vinci Surgical robotic system, which allows for enhanced visualization and surgical dexterity. Pacemaker services and a cardiac rehabilitation programs are also offered at the hospital.

Orthopedics: McLaren Flint's Orthopedic Program has performed thousands of reconstruction procedures on hips, knees and other major joints of the body. As a research and teaching center, McLaren Flint participates in Food and Drug Administration studies and works closely with manufacturers of orthopedic devices to perfect and evaluate innovative procedures for bone and joint surgeries. Joint Express is a special program in place for patients facing a knee or hip replacements emphasizing patient education and quicker recovery time.

Rehabilitation: Rehabilitation specialists represent a wide range of disciplines such as physical, occupational and speech therapy, audiology, certified therapeutic recreational therapists, physiatrists and other physicians, psychologists and neuropsychiatrists, prosthetists and orthotists.

Cancer Treatment: The Great Lakes Cancer Institute at McLaren Flint provides advanced treatment therapies in radiation oncology, medical oncology and surgical oncology. The cancer program has earned a three-year accreditation from the American College of Surgeon (ACOS) Commission on Cancer.

Kidney Disease Care: The facility partners with Reliant Renal Care in the diagnosis and treatment of kidney disorders. Treatment at the Kidney Center includes dialysis, education, patient support groups, dietary and psychological counseling. Patients who require acute dialysis are admitted to McLaren Flint, where fully computerized dialysis is provided in a specialized acute unit with cardiac monitoring capabilities.

Neurosciences: Physician specialists in neurology and neurosurgery provide a full-scope of neuroscience services. McLaren's neurosurgery program also works in cooperation with radiation oncology in offering radiosurgery to treat cranial and extracranial cancer and lesions.

Spine Care: The McLaren Spine Program is designed for the mission of improving function, alleviating pain and enhancing quality of life for people with spine problems.

Obstetrics and Women's Health – Women's Services are highlighted by the BirthPlace at Flint, which features 14 LDRP suites, an antepartum room, surgical suite for Caesarean sections, and four postpartum rooms. McLaren provides the only certified nurse-midwifery program in Genesee County. The facility also offers a dedicated gynecological post-surgical recovery unit.

Trauma and Emergency Services: Trauma and Emergency Services feature board-certified emergency physicians, radiology services, 35 beds and three trauma rooms. For less emergent illnesses and injuries McLaren has Fast Track Services located within the Emergency Department.

Behavioral Health: The McLaren Behavioral Health Center offers a 34-bed inpatient mental health unit at the hospital as well as an adult and adolescent partial hospitalization programs and outpatient services located at Oak Bridge Center in Flint Township.

Surgical Services: Surgical Services were enhanced in 2005 with the introduction of the Da Vinci robotic surgery system. Robotic surgical applications performed at McLaren include prostatectomies, cardiac procedures, gynecological surgery, bariatric surgery, hysterectomies, and some general surgical procedures.

Bariatric Institute: The McLaren Bariatric Institute is designated as a Bariatric Surgery Center of Excellence by the American Society for Metabolic and Bariatric Surgery. Surgical options offered include Laparoscopic Adjustable Gastric Banding, Laparoscopic Roux-en-Y Procedure, and Open Roux-en-Y procedure.

History 
McLaren Flint's roots in the Flint community date back to 1919, when a 10-room maternity hospital was incorporated as Women's Hospital. Located at 808 Harrison Street, the hospital focused on care for women and children. Lucy Elliott, M.D., started the hospital with nurse Lillian Girard.

By mid-1920, Women's Hospital was already outgrowing its capacity. A large house on six acres of land was found at 1900 Lapeer Street in Flint. The house was remodeled and open for patients in June 1923 with 29 rooms. In 1924, Margaret McLaren began her career as Superintendent of Women's Hospital—a career that would span more than 30 years. By 1925, the hospital again was facing capacity issues. The addition of a new North wing was completed in 1926, bringing the number of patient rooms to 40. In 1928, the Women's Hospital received accreditation by the American College of Surgeons and the American Medical Society.

After securing $2.5 million in pledges from the community throughout the 1940s, the new 203-bed hospital, named McLaren General Hospital was dedicated on September 12, 1951. The hospital is at 401 S. Ballenger Highway in Flint. After a new patient care tower was completed, the hospital changed its name to McLaren Regional Medical Center in 1990.

In later decades, McLaren would acquire hospitals in Lapeer, Bay City, and, in other regions, Mount Clemens and Lansing, forming the McLaren Health Care Corporation.  With several co-owned hospitals sharing the McLaren name, the hospital's name was shortened in 2012, becoming McLaren Flint.

References

External links 
 

Hospital buildings completed in 1951
Hospitals in Michigan
Hospitals established in 1919
Buildings and structures in Flint, Michigan
Economy of Flint, Michigan
1919 establishments in Michigan
Trauma centers